Adenia digitata is a species of flowering plant in the passionflower family, Passifloraceae. It is native to southern Africa.

References

digitata
Flora of South Africa
Flora of Botswana
Caudiciform plants